Douglas Bay may refer to the following locations:
 Douglas Harbour, located in Douglas Bay, Isle of Man
 Douglas Bay (Dominica)
 Douglas Bay, Queens, a part of the Douglaston neighborhood in the Queens borough of New York City, New York, United States